Allahabad, Iran may refer to:

Fars Province
Allahabad, Fars, a village in Eqlid County

Golestan Province
Allahabad, Golestan, a village in Ramian County

Isfahan Province
Allahabad, Ardestan, a village in Ardestan County
Allahabad, Jarqavieh Olya, a village in Isfahan County
Allahabad, Lenjan, a village in Lenjan County
Allahabad, Nain, a village in Nain County
Allahabad, Tiran and Karvan, a village in Tiran and Karvan County

Kerman Province

Anbarabad County
Allahabad-e Abu Saidi, a village in Anbarabad County
Allahabad-e Dehqani, a village in Anbarabad County
Allahabad-e Jahangir Khan, a village in Anbarabad County
Allahabad-e Olya, Kerman, a village in Anbarabad County
Allahabad-e Sofla, Kerman, a village in Anbarabad County

Bardsir County
Allahabad, Lalehzar, a village in Bardsir County

Fahraj County
Allahabad 1, a village in Fahraj County
Allahabad 2, a village in Fahraj County
Allahabad-e Chah Rigan, a village in Fahraj County
Allahabad-e Hajjiabad, a village in Fahraj County
Allahabad-e Mostowfi, a village in Fahraj County

Jiroft County
Allahabad-e Rezvan, a village in Jiroft County
Allahabad-e Seyyed, a village in Jiroft County

Kerman County
Allahabad, Kerman, a village in Kerman County
Allahabad, Ekhtiarabad, a village in Kerman County
Allahabad, Rafsanjan, a village in Rafsanjan County

Narmashir County
Allahabad-e Tabatbayi, a village in Narmashir County

Rigan County
Allahabad-e Chah-e Malek, a village in Rigan County

Rudbar-e Jonubi County
Allahabad, Rudbar-e Jonubi, a village in Rudbar-e Jonubi County
Allahabad, Jazmurian, a village in Rudbar-e Jonubi County

Sirjan County
Allahabad, Sirjan, a village in Sirjan County

Kohgiluyeh and Boyer-Ahmad Province
Allahabad, Kohgiluyeh and Boyer-Ahmad, a village in Boyer-Ahmad County

North Khorasan Province
Allahabad-e Olya, North Khorasan, a village in North Khorasan Province, Iran
Allahabad-e Sofla, North Khorasan, a village in North Khorasan Province, Iran

Razavi Khorasan Province
Allahabad, Torbat-e Heydarieh, a village in Torbat-e Heydarieh County
Allahabad, Torbat-e Jam, a village in Torbat-e Jam County

Semnan Province
Allahabad, Semnan, a village in Damghan County

Sistan and Baluchestan Province
Allahabad, Chabahar, a village in Chabahar County
Allahabad, Iranshahr, a village in Iranshahr County
Allahabad, Nukabad, a village in Khash County

South Khorasan Province
Allahabad, Nehbandan, a village in Nehbandan County
Allahabad, Tabas, a village in Tabas County

Tehran Province
Allahabad, Tehran, a village in Tehran Province, Iran

Yazd Province
Allahabad, Mehriz, a village in Mehriz County
Allahabad, Taft, a village in Taft County
Allahabad, Yazd, a village in Yazd County
Allahabad Rural District, in Yazd County